Moha, literally "admiring toad" or "toad worship", is an internet meme spoofing Jiang Zemin, former General Secretary of the Chinese Communist Party and paramount leader. It originated among the netizens in mainland China and has become a subculture on the Chinese internet. According to another explanation, it comes from China's social media Baidu Tieba. In the culture, Jiang is nicknamed há, or "toad", because of his supposed resemblance to a toad.

Another nickname for Jiang is "elder" or "senior", because he once called himself an "elder" or "senior" when he was berating Hong Kong journalist Sharon Cheung who questioned him. A video clip recording this event spread on the internet and led to the rise of the culture, which later greatly rose in popularity around 2014, when Hong Kong was experiencing a period of political instability. Initially, netizens extracted Jiang's quotes from the video and imitated his wording and tone, for parody and insult. However, as the culture developed, some imitations have taken to carrying affection toward him. The quotes for imitation have also evolved to include what he said during his leadership, and in his personal life.

Origins 
In October 2000, Chief Executive of Hong Kong, Tung Chee-hwa, went to Beijing to report to Jiang Zemin. On October 27, 2000, when Jiang Zemin and Tung Chee-hwa met with reporters before the formal talks, Hong Kong journalist Sharon Cheung questioned whether Jiang Zemin had appointed the Hong Kong Chief Executive in the election, which made Jiang Zemin angry.

Materials 

The materials of moha usually come from three famous videos about Jiang called "Three Pieces About Toad". 
 In the first video, Jiang lashed out at Hong Kong journalist Sharon Cheung in Zhongnanhai when he met with Chee-hwa Tung, Chief Executive of Hong Kong at that time.  Ms. Cheung asked if Jiang supported Tung's campaign for Chief Executive, which Jiang affirmed. Cheung then asked if it meant the Chinese government had already decided internally to re-appoint Tung. This made Jiang very upset, and criticized her for twisting his words to "make big news." Jiang then continued to criticize the Hong Kong media on the whole, claiming that they need to learn to ask more meaningful questions, even stating that "Mike Wallace of the US is at a much higher level than you are", referring to a 2000 interview Jiang gave with 60 Minutes.
 The second is the famous interview by American journalist Mike Wallace that Jiang referred to in the previous video. In this interview, Wallace and Jiang talked about many touchy subjects, such as democracy and dictatorship in China, freedom of the press, Falun Gong, and the 1989 Tiananmen Square protests.
 The third video is recorded when Jiang came back to China United Engineering Corporation (Jiang worked there for some years), and Jiang recalled his experience in the video. He also talks about Deng Xiaoping's decision to appoint him as leader of China, and what he considered his achievements during his years of leadership.

There is also a heavy focus on elements of Jiang's appearance as well, in particular his very large and thick rimmed glasses, slicked back hair, high-waisted trousers, and unusually wide smile. Toad worshippers also extract some sentences from these videos for spoofing like "too young, too simple, sometimes naive" (originally in English).

Notable statements 

Some most famous statements from Jiang are listed below. Note that phrases in italics were originally said in English.

Interview with the Hong Kong press 

 "I did not say I would handpick him [Tung Chee-hwa]. You asked me if I support Mr. Tung; I said I support him."
 "Re-election will still have to follow the [Hong Kong] Basic Law, have to... Of course, our decision is very important too!"
 "I feel that you journalist people still have to learn a bit! You're very familiar with those Western values, but after all, you're still too young!"
 "(Mike) Wallace from America, is far better than you guys. I have talked jovially with him."
 "There is one good thing about you. Whenever things happen somewhere in the world, you'll run over there faster than the Western reporters. But all the questions you ask... too simple! Sometimes naive!"
 "Pardon. As an elder, I need to tell you something. I'm not a journalist, but I've seen too much. It's necessary for me to teach (tell) you some life experiences."
 "Whenever I meet you, I want to say... There's an old saying in Chinese—'Keep silent and make a fortune.' That's the best way."
 "You people, don't want to...try to...make a big news! Saying that it's already decided internally, and then take me out for criticism. You people, naive!"
 I'm angry! I guess I displeased you guys today.

Interview with Mike Wallace 

 "You mean I'm a dictator?"
 "Even under extreme situations, our soldiers have demonstrated restraint." (referring to the Tank Man)
 "Do you trust the Falun Gong?"
 "All men are created equal."

Visiting China United Engineering Corporation 
 "This thing (book) you made for me. Excited!"
 "So Comrade Deng Xiaoping spoke to me and said, ‘The Politburo has decided. You shall be the new General Secretary.’ I said please find a better candidate! I'm really...
 "Then I recited two lines of poetry: 'One should uphold his country’s interest with his life, he should not do things just to pursue his personal gains and he should not be evade responsibilities for fear of personal loss.'"() (poem by Lin Zexu)
 What he actually said was "two poems", which might have been a slip of the tongue, as he then recited two lines of poetry from the same poem.
 "During my years in Beijing I haven't done much, just three things."
 Establishing a socialist market economy.
 Adding the Deng Xiaoping Theory to the Constitution of the Chinese Communist Party.
 Proposing the Three Represents.
 "If there's any other achievement, it is to forbid the army from doing business... The battle against the Floods of 1998 is also important. But they are all secondary. My main achievements are just these three things. Pardon me, but I've only made a tiny contribution. Thank you."

See also 

 Jiang Zemin
 Chinese internet memes
 Bushism
 Pepe the Frog

Notes

References

Further reading
Fang, Kecheng (June 19, 2018): Turning a communist party leader into an internet meme: the political and apolitical aspects of China’s toad worship culture, Information, Communication & Society

Jiang Zemin
Internet memes
Political Internet memes